Sree Siddaganga Matha  (also called  Siddaganga Kshetra) is a Lingayat matha with an attached educational institution. The matha was established by Sri Haradanahally Gosala Siddeshwara Swamigalu in the 15th century in a village in the southern state of Karnataka, India. It is located in the Tumkur taluk of Tumkur district in Karnataka.

Demographics
As of the 2001 India census, Siddaganga Matha had a population of 6335 with 6284 males and 51 females.

Matha
The matha or monastery is said to be established by Thontada Siddalingeswara to spread Lingayatism (a sampradaya of Shaivism).

The Matha (also called as Mutt) has established schools, a junior college and an engineering college, Medical College, School for Special Needs Children. It's a Gurukul for many poor people who cannot afford expensive educations. No Caste, No Religion questions are asked and only criteria needed here is hunger to learn.
Every day it provides at least three meals to people (Annadana).

Establishment of Siddaganga Mutt
The history of Sree Siddaganga Mutt starts from the 14th century. The holy names associated with the establishment and the growth of the Mutt are as follows:
 Sree Hardanahalli Gosala Siddeshwara Swamigalu (c1300 – 1350)
 Sree Hardanahalli Shankaracharya Swamigalu (c1393)
 Sree Hardanahalli Gosala Channabasavarajendra Swamigalu
 Sree Tontada Siddalingeshwara Swamiji (c1400 – 1480A.D.)
 Sree Haradanahalli Gosala Siddeshwara was the 15th in the order of peetacharya (Head of Mutt) of Niranjana Jagadguru. He handed over his headship to the next peetacharya in Haradanahalli and went to Shivaganga with his 101 followers to create his own independent place for his religious work. Then he moved to a hill near Keta Samudra (now Kyathasandra) from Shivaganga. He created 101 caves for his followers for study and meditation and also established the Mutt at Siddaganga.

It is said that to quench the thirst of one of his aged disciples Sree Gosala Siddesshwara, he hit the rock and a stream of water came out of that rock. The holy water was named as "Siddaganga" and the name was thus given to this place. Locals believe that this holy water has power to heal the mental and physical ailments and is allowed to be used by all communities.
Sree Gosalasiddeshwara's disciple Sree Shankaracharya Swamiji continued his work until the late fifteenth century.

Sree Tontada Siddalingeshawara Swamiji made a revolutionary contribution to the development of Siddaganga Mutt. Later he moved to Yediyur and stayed there until the end of his life. Though Gosala Siddeshwara is considered to have established Siddaganga Mutt, Sree Sree Tontada Siddalingeshwara Swamiji is regarded as its first Head. Most of the daily, monthly and annual rituals and the cart festival are since then held in his name.

No exact details on the development of Mutt are available after the 15th century to the 18th century.

A new era of developmental activities of Sree Siddaganga Mutt begins with Sree Ataveeshwara Swamigalu.

The history of Sree Siddaganga Mutt in the last two centuries can be regarded as highly progressive due to its most revered, respected, humane, empowered with knowledge and wisdom of two of its greatest religious leaders. The first is Sree Sree Uddana Shivayogiglu and the second Dr. Sree Sree Sree Shivakumara Swami, who died on 21 January 2019.
Next Siddalinga Swami will take full responsibility of mutt.

There is also a Sandalwood movie being shot on Shree and is also called as Shree.

See also
Tumkur
 Districts of Karnataka

References

External links
 http://Tumkur.nic.in/
Chikkanna Swamy Temple, Gulur Website

Villages in Tumkur district
Hindu monasteries in India